is a Japanese basketball player. He competed in the men's tournament at the 1956 Summer Olympics.

References

1934 births
Living people
Japanese men's basketball players
Olympic basketball players of Japan
Basketball players at the 1956 Summer Olympics
Place of birth missing (living people)
Asian Games medalists in basketball
Asian Games bronze medalists for Japan
Basketball players at the 1954 Asian Games
Medalists at the 1954 Asian Games